The Chief of Navy is the most senior appointment in the Royal Australian Navy, responsible to the Chief of the Defence Force (CDF) and the Secretary of Defence.  The rank associated with the position is vice admiral (3-star).

Vice Admiral Mark Hammond is the current Chief of Navy; he assumed the position on 6 July 2022.

Appointees

The following list chronologically records those who have held the post of Chief of Navy or its preceding positions. Rank and honours are as at the completion of the individual's tours.

Notes

Royal Australian Navy
Royal Australian Navy admirals
Leadership of the Australian Defence Force
Military appointments of Australia
 
Australia